Raymond Patrick Hogan (8 May 1932 – 25 November 1995) was an Australian cricketer.  Hogan was a right-handed batsman who bowled right-arm fast-medium.  He was born at Temora, New South Wales.

Hogan played all his first-class cricket in England, making three appearances for Northamptonshire against Cambridge University in 1954, and Yorkshire and Gloucestershire in 1955. He had little success in these matches, scoring just 18 runs at an average of 4.50, with a high score of 8, and taking 3 wickets at a bowling average of 72.66, with best figures of 2/16.

He died at Pine Rivers, Queensland on 25 November 1995.

References

External links
Raymond Hogan at ESPNcricinfo
Raymond Hogan at CricketArchive

1932 births
1995 deaths
Cricketers from New South Wales
Australian cricketers
Northamptonshire cricketers
People from the Riverina